Alex Perialas is an American audio engineer, mixer, and record producer, best known for his extensive work during the "golden age" of thrash metal in the mid–1980s to early–1990s.  Having worked with many of the genre's top acts, including Overkill, Testament, Anthrax, Nuclear Assault, S.O.D., and Flotsam & Jetsam, Perialas later went on to work with  hardcore punk band Bad Religion, groove metal band Pro-Pain and hip–hop/rock band Such A Surge.

In addition to owning and operating Pyramid Sound Studios in Ithaca, New York, where he still does mixing and recording, Perialas was also the director of the Sound Recording Technology program at Ithaca College in Ithaca, NY.

Works (1983–2015)
Metallica – Kill 'Em All (1983), Mastering
Anthrax – Fistful of Metal (1984), Assistant engineer
Raven – Live at the Inferno (1984), Engineer
Exciter – Violence & Force (1984), Assistant engineer
Anthrax – Armed and Dangerous (1985), Engineer
Overkill – Feel the Fire (1985), Engineer
Raven – Stay Hard (1985), Assistant engineer
S.O.D. – Speak English or Die (1985), Producer (with Scott Ian), engineer
Anthrax – Spreading the Disease (1985), Engineer
Nuclear Assault – Brain Death (EP) (1986), Producer
E-X-E – Stricken by Might (1986), Engineer 
AT WAR- Retaliatory Strike (1987) Producer, engineer
M.O.D. – U.S.A. for M.O.D. (1987), Producer (with Scott Ian), engineer
Testament – The Legacy (1987), Producer, engineer
Carnivore – Retaliation (1987), Producer, engineer, mixer
Nuclear Assault – Game Over (1987), Producer, engineer
Testament – Live at Eindhoven (1987), Producer, engineer
Overkill – !!!Fuck You!!! EP (1987), Producer
Blessed Death – Destined for Extinction (1987), Producer
Agnostic Front – Liberty and Justice For... (1987), Engineer
Overkill – Under the Influence (1988), Producer (with Overkill), engineer
Testament – The New Order (1988), Producer, engineer, mixer
M.O.D. – Surfin' M.O.D. (1988), Producer, engineer, mixer
Anthrax – State of Euphoria (1988), Associate producer, engineer
Testament – Practice What You Preach (1989), Producer
Anthrax – Penikufesin EP (1989), Associate producer, engineer
M.O.D. – Gross Misconduct (1989), Producer, engineer
Holy Moses – The New Machine of Liechtenstein (1989), Producer
Flotsam & Jetsam – When the Storm Comes Down (1990), Producer, engineer, mixer
Vio-lence – Oppressing the Masses (1990), Producer, engineer, mixer
Wrathchild America – 3-D (1991), Producer, engineer
Silence – 3 song demo tape featuring "One Race" (1991), Engineer, recorder, mixer
Blessed Death – Hour of Pain (1991), Producer
S.O.D. – Live at Budokan (1992), Producer, engineer, mixing
Pro-Pain – Foul Taste of Freedom (1992), Producer, engineer, mixer
Piece Dogs – Exes for Eyes (1992)
Overkill – I Hear Black (1993), Producer (with Overkill), engineer
Testament – Return to the Apocalyptic City (1993), Producer, engineer
Strip Mind- Whats in Your mouth (1993), Producer
LWS (Holland) – Reality (1993), Producer
Accuser – Reflections (1994), Producer
Pro-Pain – The Truth Hurts (1994), Producer (with Gary Meskil)
M.O.D. – Devolution (1994), Mastering
BELLADONNA (Joey Belladonna solo album) 1995 - Producer (w/ Joey Belladonna), and engineer
Such A Surge – Schatten (1995), Producer
Accuser – Taken by the Throat (1995), Producer
Such A Surge – Under Pressure (1995), Producer (all but one track)
Without Warning – Believe (1996), Producer
Without Warning – Step Beyond (1998), Producer
Bad Religion – No Substance (1998), Producer (with Bad Religion & Ronnie Kimball), engineer
Overkill – Coverkill (1999), Mixer
Joe Bonamassa – A New Day Yesterday (2000), Production assistance, engineer, mixer
Giant Panda Guerilla Dub Squad – Slow Down (2006), Producer, engineer
 At War – Infidel (2009), Producer, engineer
 Birth A.D. – I Blame You (2013), Producer, engineer, mixing
 Seeming — Worldburners (2015), mixing

External links
 Discogs.com
 Ithaca College Faculty

Living people
Ithaca College faculty
American record producers
American audio engineers
Year of birth missing (living people)